Real Club Celta de Vigo contested La Liga, the UEFA Cup and Copa del Rey in the 1999–2000 season. Being title contenders up until Christmas, Celta lost their form in the second half of the season, aside from a 4–0 victory against Juventus in the last 16 of the UEFA Cup. The result was 7th and quarter finals of the UEFA Cup, which meant the side missed out on Champions League football once again. The club also missed the chance to become the first Spanish championship-winning team from Galicia, with arch rivals Deportivo de La Coruña winning La Liga.

First-team squad

Left club during season

La Liga

League table

Results by round

Matches

Copa del Rey

Eightfinals

UEFA Cup

1st Round

2nd round

Round of 32

Round of 16

Quarter-finals

Statistics

Players statistics

Sources
   FootballSquads - Celta Vigo 1999/2000
   RSSSF - Spain 1999/2000 (Top Three Levels)

RC Celta de Vigo seasons
Celta